Goneplacidae is a family of crabs of the order Decapoda and the superfamily Goneplacoidea. It includes the following genera:

† Amydrocarcinus Schweitzer, Feldmann, Gonzáles-Barba & Vega, 2002
Bathyplax A. Milne-Edwards, 1880
Carcinoplax H. Milne-Edwards, 1852
Entricoplax Castro, 2007
Exopheticus Castro, 2007
Goneplacoides Castro, 2007
Goneplax Leach, 1814
Hadroplax Castro, 2007
† Icriocarcinus Bishop, 1988
† Kowaicarcinus Feldmann, Schweitzer, Maxwell & Kelley, 2008
† Magyarcarcinus Schweitzer & Karasawa, 2004
Menoplax Castro, 2007
Microgoneplax Castro, 2007
Neogoneplax Castro, 2007
Neommatocarcinus Takeda & Miyake, 1969
Notonyx A. Milne-Edwards, 1873
Ommatocarcinus White, 1852
Paragoneplax Castro, 2007
Pedroplax Ng & Komai, 2011
Psopheticus Wood-Mason, 1892
Pycnoplax Castro, 2007
Singhaplax Serène & Soh, 1976

References

External links

Goneplacoidea
Decapod families